Arothron gillbanksii is a species of pufferfish in the family Tetraodontidae. It is a temperate marine species native to New Zealand, although it is of uncertain classification and may belong to a genus other than Arothron.

References 

gillbanksii
Fish described in 1897